Big Stick was an unincorporated community in Raleigh County, West Virginia, United States. It lies along County Route 3/2, beside Winding Gulf. This community is part of the Winding Gulf Coalfield in Raleigh County.

Name 
This community got its name from Theodore Roosevelt's Big Stick Policy, which was based on a West African proverb, "Speak softly and carry a big stick."

References

Unincorporated communities in Raleigh County, West Virginia
Unincorporated communities in West Virginia
Coal towns in West Virginia